Magnus the Pious may refer to:

Magnus the Pious, Duke of Brunswick-Lüneburg, (died 1369)
Magnus the Pious (Warhammer), fictional character in Warhammer Fantasy